Kapawe'no 231 is an Indian reserve of the Kapawe'no First Nation in Alberta, located within Big Lakes County. It is 86 kilometres north of Swan Hills.

References

Indian reserves in Alberta